Vasily "Torero" Shish (born 7 August 1982) is a Belarusian Muay Thai middleweight kickboxer fighting out of Minsk, Belarus for the Chinuk Gym.  He is a five time world and five time European Muaythai and kickboxing champion who has won titles at both amateur and professional level.  Vasily has fought for several notable promotions such as K-1 MAX and (the now defunct) Thai & Kickbox SuperLeague.

Career/Biography

Growing up in Minsk, Vasily joined the famous Gym "Kick Fighter" in 1996 where he studied Muay Thai alongside future world champions such as Andrei Kulebin, Aliaksei Pekarchyk and Dmitry Shakuta.  In 1998 he won his first title as an amateur at the I.A.M.T.F. European Championships in Spain, winning a gold medal in the -51 kg category aged just 15 years old, also winning the honour of "best technique".  The next year he went to the world championships in Bangkok where he won a bronze medal competing against much more experienced fighters.  In 1999 he was part of the Belarus team which won an incredible eight gold medals (out of twelve) in the Thai-boxing section at the W.A.K.O. world championships.  What was even more impressive was that seven of the winners came from Vasily's Kick Fighter gym.

In 2000 Vasily won his first pro title (I.K.F. world) by defeating American Richard Kostuck in less than 40 seconds in Minsk.  He carried on in an excellent year by winning a gold medal at the amateur European Muaythai championships  before finishing the year with a gold medal in Sydney at the World Cup in Martial Arts event.  Between 2001 and 2003 Vasily won more amateur and pro world and European titles with the I.A.M.T.F., I.S.S/Brute Force, W.A.K.O. and World Kickboxing Network (W.K.N.) organizations, moving up in weight and relinquishing his I.K.F. world title as he did so.  By 2003 Vasily sought more competitive matches joining the newly created Thai & Kickbox SuperLeague where he would be given the chance to fight world champions every event.  Things did not go exactly as planned for Vasily and he only had two fights with the organization – losing both.

By 2004 Vasily had parted from his longtime gym "Kick Fighter" after  seven years and joined the rival Chinuk Gym in Minsk.  With his new gym he had the opportunity to make up for his disappointing SuperLeague performances after being called up by the then world's biggest kickboxing organization K-1 to take part in an elimination match for the 2005 K-1 MAX final.  Vasily faced a daunting task in Tokyo, with the reigning champion Buakaw Por.Pramuk standing in the way of a place of the final 8.  After three rounds it was clear that Vasily had no chance of upsetting the odds on favorite, losing every round in a third round unanimous decision loss.

Since his K-1 MAX appearance Vasily has been on the fringes of the kickboxing scene, taking many fights across the border in Russia with the highlight being holding the W.B.K.F. European title between 2006 and 2007.  He has also made a number of appearances on smaller European promotions such as Klash and Janus Fight with limited success, wins against Paolo Balicha and Michal Hansgut being nullified by defeats against Alviar Lima, Paulo Balicha and Fadi Merza.

Titles

Professional
2006-07 W.B.K.F. European champion (0 title defences)
2003 W.K.N. Muaythai super lightweight world champion -66.7 kg
2002 I.S.S./Brute Force world champion
2000 I.K.F. Pro Muaythai super lightweight world champion -62.2 kg (0 title defences - vacated)

Amateur
2002 W.A.K.O. European championships in Jesolo, Italy  -67 kg
2002 I.A.M.T.F. European championships in Cyprus  -67 kg
2001 I.A.M.T.F. World Muaythai Championships in Bangkok, Thailand  -63.5 kg
2000 World Cup in Martial Arts in Sydney, Australia  -63.5 kg
2000 I.A.M.T.F. European championships in Athens, Greece  -63.5 kg
1999 W.A.K.O. World Championships in Caorle, Italy  -63.5 kg 
1999 I.A.M.T.F. World Muaythai Championships in Bangkok, Thailand  -63.5 kg
1998 I.A.M.T.F. European championships in Calafell, Spain  -51 kg

Professional Kickboxing Record 

|-
|-  bgcolor="#FFBBBB"
| 2008-04-20 || Loss ||align=left| Fadi Merza || Fight Night Vienna || Vienna, Austria || Decision || 3 || 3:00
|- 
|-  bgcolor="#FFBBBB"
| 2007-12-15 || Loss ||align=left| Paulo Balicha || Swiss Las Vegas II || Basel, Switzerland || Decision || 3 || 3:00 
|-
! style=background:white colspan=9 |
|-
|-  bgcolor="#FFBBBB"
| 2007-10-26 || Loss ||align=left| Alviar Lima || KlasH III "Show of No Mercy" || Sibiu, Romania || Decision (Unanimous) || 3 || 3:00
|-
|-  bgcolor="#FFBBBB"
| 2007-03-21 || Loss ||align=left| Konstantin Sbitov || Fight Club Arbat || Moscow, Russia || TKO || || 
|-
! style=background:white colspan=9 |
|-
|-  bgcolor="#CCFFCC"
| 2006-11-06 || Win ||align=left| Nikolai Koreneev || BARS - European Welterweight Championship '06 || Moscow, Russia || Decision (Majority) || 8 || 3:00 
|-
! style=background:white colspan=9 |
|-
|-  bgcolor="#CCFFCC"
| 2006-11-06 || Win ||align=left| Artur Shamkhalov || Ufa Fight Night || Ufa, Russia || KO || 5 || 
|-
|-  bgcolor="#FFBBBB"
| 2006-07-21 || Loss ||align=left| Petr Nakonechnyi || S-1 European Elimination - Round 1 || Russia || Decision || 3 || 3:00
|-
|-  bgcolor="#c5d2ea"
| 2006-06-21 || Draw ||align=left| Kumar Zhaliev || Fight Club Arbat || Moscow, Russia || Decision Draw || 3 || 3:00 
|-
|-  bgcolor="#FFBBBB"
| 2006-03-10 || Loss ||align=left| Petr Nakonechnyi || K-1 East Europe MAX 2006, Super Fight || Vilnius, Lithuania || Ext.R Decision (Majority) || 4 || 3:00
|-
|-  bgcolor="#FFBBBB"
| 2005-11-19 || Loss ||align=left| Yassine Benhadj || Janus Fight 2005, Semi Final || Padova, Italy || Decision || 3 || 3:00   
|-
|-  bgcolor="#CCFFCC"
| 2005-11-19 || Win ||align=left| Michal Hansgut || Janus Fight 2005, Quarter Final || Padova, Italy || KO (High Kick) || 2 ||   
|-
|-  bgcolor="#c5d2ea"
| 2005-10-26 || Draw ||align=left| Alen Ofoyo || Fight Club Arbat || Moscow, Russia || Decision Draw || 3 || 3:00 
|-
|-  bgcolor="#FFBBBB"
| 2005-09-30 || Loss ||align=left| Farid Khider || Kings of Muaythai: Belarus vs Europe || Minsk, Belarus || Decision || 5 || 3:00
|-
! style=background:white colspan=9 |
|- 
|-  bgcolor="#CCFFCC"
| 2005-09-24 || Win ||align=left| Paulo Balicha || Fight Night Winterthur || Winterthur, Switzerland || TKO || 4 ||   
|-
|-  bgcolor="#FFBBBB"
| 2005-06-15 || Loss ||align=left| Alexei Krasko || Fight Club Arbat || Moscow, Russia || Decision || 3 || 3:00 
|-
|-  bgcolor="#FFBBBB"
| 2005-05-04 || Loss ||align=left| Buakaw Por. Pramuk || K-1 World MAX 2005 World Tournament Open || Tokyo, Japan || Decision (Unanimous) || 3 || 3:00
|-
! style=background:white colspan=9 |
|-
|-  bgcolor="#CCFFCC"
| 2004-10-27 || Win ||align=left| Alexandr Demchenko || Fight Club Arbat || Moscow, Russia || KO || || 
|-
|-  bgcolor="#CCFFCC"
| 2004-10-26 || Win ||align=left| Elbrus Dzhumakov || Russian Muaythai League || Moscow, Russia || KO || 3 || 
|-
|-  bgcolor="#CCFFCC"
| 2004-05-19 || Win ||align=left| Sergey Zemnevich || Fight Club Arbat || Moscow, Russia || Decision (Unanimous) || 3 || 3:00  
|-
|-  bgcolor="#FFBBBB"
| 2003-09-27 || Loss ||align=left| Chris van Venrooij || SuperLeague Germany 2003 || Wuppertal, Germany || Decision || 5 || 3:00
|-
|-  bgcolor="#FFBBBB"
| 2003-05-10 || Loss ||align=left| Eddy Saban || SuperLeague Austria 2003 || Vienna, Austria || Decision || 5 || 3:00
|-
|-  bgcolor="#CCFFCC"
| 2002-12-19 || Win ||align=left| Petr Nakonechnyi || Belarus vs Ukraine || Bilohirsk, Ukraine || Decision || 5 || 3:00
|-
|-  bgcolor="#CCFFCC"
| 2002-00-00 || Win ||align=left| || Brute Force Challenge || Pattaya, Thailand || Decision || 5 || 3:00
|-
! style=background:white colspan=9 |
|-
|-  bgcolor="#CCFFCC"
| 2002-09-14 || Win ||align=left| Baker Barakat || Night of KO || Sopot, Poland || KO || 3 ||   
|-
! style=background:white colspan=9 |
|-
|-  bgcolor="#CCFFCC"
| 2002-00-00 || Win ||align=left| James Cook || Belarus vs USA || New York, NY, USA || Decision || 5 || 3:00
|-
|-  bgcolor="#CCFFCC"
| 2000-00-00 || Win ||align=left| || Belarus vs Australia || Sydney, Australia || KO || ||
|-
|-  bgcolor="#CCFFCC"
| 2000-06-29 || Win ||align=left| Kongdej Ratanachot || Russia vs Thailand || Novosibirsk, Russia || Decision || 5 || 3:00
|-
|-  bgcolor="#CCFFCC"
| 2000-00-00 || Win ||align=left| Parynya Dongtiamsee || Belarus vs Thailand || Minsk, Belarus || Decision || 5 || 3:00
|-
|-  bgcolor="#CCFFCC"
| 2000-01-14 || Win ||align=left| Richard Kostuck || USA vs Belarus || Minsk, Belarus || TKO (Doc Stop/Cut by Elbow) || 1 || 0:38
|-
! style=background:white colspan=9 |
|-
|-
| colspan=9 | Legend:

Mixed Martial Arts Record 

|-
|-  bgcolor="#FFBBBB"
| 2006-08-23 || Loss ||align=left| Dzhabar Askerov || Belorechensk Fight Night 2 || Belorechensk, Russia || Submission || 1 || 
|-
| colspan=9| Legend:

See also
List of WAKO Amateur World Championships
List of WAKO Amateur European Championships
List of male kickboxers

References

External links
 Chinuk Gym Official Website
 Gym "Kick Fighter" Official Website

1982 births
Living people
Belarusian male kickboxers
Belarusian Muay Thai practitioners
Lightweight kickboxers
Welterweight kickboxers
Middleweight kickboxers
Belarusian male mixed martial artists
Mixed martial artists utilizing Muay Thai